The Asia-Pacific Journal of Atmospheric Sciences is a quarterly peer-reviewed scientific journal covering the field of atmospheric science. It was established in 1965 as the Journal of the Korean Meteorological Society, obtaining its current title in 2008. It is published by Springer Science+Business Media on behalf of the Korean Meteorological Society and the editor-in-chief is Chang-Hoi Ho (Seoul National University). According to the Journal Citation Reports, the journal has a 2020 impact factor of 2.100.

References

External links 
 

Springer Science+Business Media academic journals
Earth and atmospheric sciences journals
Publications established in 1965
English-language journals
Quarterly journals
Academic journals associated with learned and professional societies